Deh Shiva Bar Mohe Eha (Gurmukhi: ਦੇਹ ਸਿਵਾ ਬਰ ਮੋਹਿ ਇਹੈ) is a most celebrated and widely quoted hymn by Guru Gobind Singh. It is taken from Chandi Charitar Ukati Bilas composition of Dasam Granth.

Translation
Gurmukhi Script
Devanagari Script
Shahmukhi Script
English Translation

O Almighty, give me this boon,
May I never ever shirk from doing good deeds,
that I shall not fear when I go into combat.
And with determination I will be victorious.
That I may teach myself this creed alone,
to speak only of Thy (almighty) praises.
And when the last days of my life come,
I may die in the might of the battlefield.

External links
www.sridasamgranth.com
History and scripture of the Dasam Granth
Recording by Atam Ras Kirtan

Dasam Granth
Hymns
17th-century poems
Indian poems
Sikh music